Satarupa is a genus of spread-winged skippers in the family Hesperiidae.

Species
 Satarupa formosibia Strand, 1927
 Satarupa gopala Moore, 1866
 Satarupa monbeigi Oberthür, 1921 West China
 Satarupa nymphalis (Speyer, 1879) South China, Korea, Ussuri
 Satarupa splendens Tytler, 1914 Naga Hills, Assam, Yunnan
 Satarupa valentini Oberthür, 1921 West China
 Satarupa zulla Tytler, 1915

Etymology

Satarupa comes from the Pali śatá (Sanskrit शत shata) meaning "100" and rupa (Sanskrit रूप "rūpa") meaning "form" or "beauty", thus meaning "one hundred (beautiful) forms". It is the name given the wife of Manu; compare the goddess Saraswati.

References

Citations
Natural History Museum Lepidoptera genus database

External links
Funet Taxonomy, distribution
Images representing Satarupa  at  Consortium for the Barcode of Life

Tagiadini
Hesperiidae genera
Taxa named by Frederic Moore